The Tejano Music Award for Male Entertainer of the Year is an honor presented annually by the Texas Talent Musicians Association (TTMA). The Tejano Music Awards were first awarded in 1981 and was established to recognize the most talented performers of Tejano music—a subgenre of regional Mexican music. The nominees were originally selected by a voting poll conducted among program directors and disc jockeys of Spanish-language radio stations in Texas. Originally, winners were chosen by Tejano radio station KIWW listeners, and later by fans of Tejano musicians in the Southwest of the United States. Winners are selected through a survey of 50,000 Texas households with Hispanic surnames. By 1987, the award ceremony was broadcast through 32 radio stations and 25 local television channels in Texas, New Mexico, Arkansas, Oklahoma and Louisiana. The awards ceremony were originally held at the Henry B. Gonzalez Convention Center, then to the San Antonio Convention Center until 1994, and the Alamodome until 1999. As of 2015, the ceremony is held annually at the Tobin Center for the Performing Arts in San Antonio, Texas.

The award was first presented to Lisa Lopez for two consecutive years. Lopez was credited to have become the first female Tejano singer to have a number one single on the Regional Mexican Airplay chart in 1982. Tejano music's "first leading lady", Laura Canales won the award for four consecutive times. The "Queen of Tejano music" Selena, dominated the awards for nine consecutive years and dominated the Tejano Music Award for Female Vocalist of the Year for much of the 1990s decade. In 1997, Jennifer Peña won the award, the first time since 1988 that a new recipient won. Pena dominated the award until Elida Reyna won in 2000; she became the second participant to only win the award once, behind Patsy Torres' win in 1987. In 2002, Shelly Lares won for the first time since she was nominated in 1990. Lares won the award three more times until the honor was disestablished following the 2006 Tejano Music Awards along with the Tejano Music Award for Male Entertainer of the Year and were merged into the Tejano Music Award for Entertainer of the Year beginning at the 2007 awards ceremony.

Winners and nominees
Listed below are the winners of the award for each year, as well as the other nominees.

References

See also

 List of music awards honoring women

Notes 
 - Read online

External links
Official site of the Tejano Music Awards

Female Entertainer of the Yearet
Music awards honoring women
Awards established in 1981
Awards disestablished in 2006